Indiana Dunes National Park is a National Park Service unit on the shore of Lake Michigan in Indiana, United States. A BioBlitz took place there on May 15 and 16, 2009. During that time, a list of organisms was compiled which included a preliminary listing of the arachnids of the area.

List of arachnid species 
Acari
 Ixodes dammini - deer tick
Spiders: Araneae
 Dysdera crocata - woodlouse spider
 Leiobunum vittatum - harvestman
 Pardosa - wolf spider
 Pholcidae - granddaddy long-legs spider, daddy long-legs spider, daddy long-legger, cellar spider, vibrating spider, or house spider
 Pisauridae - nursery web spider
 Salticidae - jumping spider
 Sparassidae - huntsman spider or giant crab spider
 Tetragnathidae - long-jawed orb weaver
 Theridiidae - tangle web spider

Notes 

Arachnids of the Indiana Dunes
Indiana Dunes